Pablo Paras Garcia (September 25, 1925 – August 18, 2021) was a Filipino lawyer and politician who have been the patriarch of the Garcia political clan of Province of Cebu. He was a longtime congressman and governor.

Early career 
A topnotcher in the 1951 Bar Examinations (3rd place), he was a distinguished trial lawyer, law professor, and respected constitutionalist. Garcia was an opposition lawyer during the Marcos Sr. dictatorship. He is one of the many lawyers who helped the opposition in Cebu when 1986 snap elections happen.

Political career 
Garcia served as governor of Cebu from 1995 to 2004. He had previously served as the vice-governor of Cebu from 1969 to 1971. Garcia has been elected to three terms as a Member of the House of Representatives of the Philippines. From 1987 to 1995, Garcia represented the Third District of Cebu. He was again elected to Congress in 2007, this time representing the Second District of Cebu. He was defeated in his bid for re-election in 2013.

His daughter Gwendolyn succeeded him as governor in 2004, while his son Pablo John was elected to Garcia's previous congressional seat in 2007. In 2007, the Garcia family established the One Cebu political party. Garcia was also a member of Lakas Kampi CMD.

His son, Byron, the former security consultant for the Cebu provincial government, gained attention in 2007 after instituting a program of choreographed exercise routines for the inmates of the Cebu Provincial Detention and Rehabilitation Center (CPDRC) and uploading the routines on YouTube, including the popular Thriller viral video. Garcia's other son, Winston Garcia, is the former president and general manager of the Government Service Insurance System (Philippines) and the official candidate of One Cebu for provincial governor on May 9 (date of 2016 Philippine general election).

In 2010, his son  Nelson Gamaliel was elected in large margin as Mayor of Dumanjug, Cebu. At the same time Marlon, the younger brother of Nelson Gamaliel was also elected Vice-Mayor of the Municipality of Barili, Cebu.

He was elected Chairman of the Committee on Revision of Laws on 7 August 2007; and, when the House leadership was changed, he was consequently appointed Deputy Speaker in May 2008.

References

1925 births
2021 deaths
Lakas–CMD politicians
Members of the House of Representatives of the Philippines from Cebu
Governors of Cebu
Members of the Cebu Provincial Board
University of San Carlos alumni
National Unity Party (Philippines) politicians
Pablo
Deputy Speakers of the House of Representatives of the Philippines
Vice Governors of Cebu
Recipients of the Presidential Medal of Merit (Philippines)